Horsley may refer to:

 Horsley (surname), a surname
 Hawker Horsley, a 1920s bomber aircraft produced by Hawker Aircraft

Places in Australia
 Horsley, New South Wales, a suburb in Wollongong, New South Wales
 Horsley Park, New South Wales, a suburb of Sydney, New South Wales

Places in the United Kingdom
 Horsley, Derbyshire, a village north of Derby, England
 Horsley, Gloucestershire, a hamlet and civil parish in Gloucestershire, England
 Horsley, Northumberland, a village and civil parish near Prudhoe, England
 Horsley, Rochester, a location in Northumberland, England
 Horsley Cross, a hamlet in Essex, England
 Horsleycross Street, a hamlet in Essex, England
 Horsley railway station, a railway station in East Horsley, Surrey, England
 Horsley Hall, Gresford, a former house in Wrexham County Borough, Wales
 East Horsley, a village in Surrey, England
 West Horsley, a village in Surrey, England